Methyl-DOB, or 4-bromo-2,5-dimethoxy-N-methylamphetamine, is a lesser-known psychedelic drug.  It is similar in structure to DOB. Methyl-DOB was first synthesized by Alexander Shulgin. In his book PiHKAL (Phenethylamines i Have Known And Loved), the minimum dosage is listed as 8 mg, and the effects onset begin after 3 hours and last up to 36 hours. Methyl-DOB produces many physical effects, such as mydriasis and muscle tenseness, but few psychoactive effects. Very little data exists about the pharmacological properties, metabolism, and toxicity of Methyl-DOB.

See also 

 Phenethylamine
 Psychedelics, dissociatives and deliriants

External links 
 Methyl-DOB entry in PiHKAL
 Methyl-DOB entry in PiHKAL • info

Methamphetamines